Val de Bagnes, also called the Vallée de Bagnes (German: Bangital or Baniental) is a valley located in the Entremont District in the Canton of Valais of Switzerland.

Geography
Val de Bagnes is traversed by the Drance de Bagnes. In the upper part of the valley is the Lac de Mauvoisin and towards the southern end of the valley the Glacier de Fenêtre and the Chanrion Hut. From Val de Bagnes, the Aosta Valley can be reached via the Fenêtre de Durand in the Grand Combin. At Sembrancher, the Val de Bagnes flows into the Val d’Entremont.

The main mountain peaks in Val de Bagnes are:
 Grand Combin 
 La Ruinette 
 Mont Blanc de Cheilon 
 Petit Combin 
 Mont Gelé 
 Pointe d'Otemma 
 Rosablanche 
 Mont Avril

Municipalities
Most of the valley is organized into a single municipality, also called  Val de Bagnes, while a small part extends into the neighboring municipality of Sembrancher. The most famous resort in Val de Bagnes is Verbier. Other villages include:
 Le Châble, the municipal seat.

 Villette
 Le Cotterg
 Fontanelle
 Médières
 Vollèges
 Vens
 Le Levron
 Bruson
 Versegères
 Prarreyer
 Champsec
 Lourtier 
 Sarreyer 
 Fionnay

Tourism
Tourism emerged in Val de Bagnes at the end of the 19th century. Numerous infrastructure projects have been carried out for tourism; the Médran chairlift was built in 1950 (winter tourism); Summer tourism began in Fionnay as early as 1890, then also in Bruson and Verbier.

Transport
Val de Bagnes is accessible by rail through the Martigny–Orsières Railway. The Martigny–Sembrancher line, which continues to Orsières in the Val d’Entremont, was completed in 1910. The Sembrancher – Le Châble branch line into the Val de Bagnes was completed in 1952.
At Martigny, the A21/H21 branches off from the A9 in the direction of the Great St Bernard Tunnel and branches off at Sembrancher into the Val de Bagnes and Val d’Entremont.

References

Bagnes
Landforms of Valais